Ibrahim bin Yaacob (1911 – 8 March 1979) was a Malayan politician. An opponent of the British colonial government, he was president and founder of the Kesatuan Melayu Muda (KMM). During World War II, he supported the Japanese during their occupation of Malaya. Arrested by the British colonial government, he was freed by the Japanese in February 1942, and went on to save hundreds of Malayan soldiers from being killed during the occupation; this saved him from being arrested by Force 136 after the war. He died in Jakarta on 8 March 1979.

Ibrahim was born in Temerloh, Pahang, to a family of Bugis descent. In 1929, he joined the Sultan Idris Teachers' Training College and graduated two years later as a teacher. During the 1930s, he wrote a series of articles that were critical of the British administration in Malay newspapers and was later forced to resign after receiving a warning from the British authorities. He became the editor of a nationalistic newspaper, Majlis, and formed the KMM in 1938. The goal of KMM was to achieve independence for Malaya through union with Indonesia. As a member of KMM, he welcomed and worked with Japanese as he believed that Japanese would aid Malaya in gaining independence and support its fifth column activities.

Places named after him
Several places were named after him, including:
 SMK Dato' Ibrahim Yaacob, a secondary school in Kuala Lumpur
 Kolej Ibrahim Yaakub, a residential college at Universiti Kebangsaan Malaysia, Bangi, Selangor

References

1911 births
1979 deaths
Malaysian people of Bugis descent
Malaysian politicians
Malayan collaborators with Imperial Japan
People from Pahang
Japanese occupation of Singapore
Members of the Dewan Negara
Sultan Idris Education University alumni